The Tour de Ski (TdS) is a cross-country skiing event held annually since the 2006–07 season in Central Europe, modeled on the Tour de France of cycling. The Tour de Ski is a Stage World Cup event in the FIS Cross-Country World Cup. Each Tour de Ski has consisted of six to nine stages, held during late December and early January in the Czech Republic, Germany, Italy, and Switzerland. As of 2022, the prize money for the event amount to 770,000 Swiss francs (779,000 euros), shared out on both men and women. Men's and women's events are held together on the same days, with the only difference being the distance skied.

The stage hosts changes every year, but some of the format stays the same with the diversity of competitions; sprints, mass starts, races with individual starts and pursuits. The Tour de Ski has every year concluded with two or three stages in Val di Fiemme, with the final stage where the skiers race up the alpine skiing course on Alpe Cermis in Cavalese.

There are usually between 20 and 30 nations participating, with the numbers of skiers from each nation based on quotas with a maximum of 10 skiers. All of the stages are timed to the finish; the skiers' times are compounded with their previous stage times. The skier with the lowest cumulative finishing times is the overall leader of the race and wears the yellow leader bib. While the overall standings garners the most attention, there are two other contests held within the Tour: the point standings (previously called "sprint standings") for the sprinters and the team standings for the fastest teams.

History

Origins

Cross-country skiing had been through a period of renewal from the early 1980s, when the free technique was first introduced to the World Championships which led to a rush of new events, including pursuit skiing, sprint skiing and eventually long mass start races, to complement the traditional time trial or individual start style of skiing. The Tour de Ski is another such new event, and the idea has been reported to come from a meeting between former Olympic gold medallist Vegard Ulvang and Jürg Capol, the International Ski Federation's (FIS) chief executive officer for cross-country competitions, in Ulvang's sauna in Maridalen, Norway. Their idea was to create a stage competition consisting of different events which they expected would lead to several days of continuous excitement before the most complete skiers would become Tour de Ski champions. Ulvang has also brought up the idea of a tour of the Barents Region, Tour de Barents, with stages in Kirkenes (Sandnes) and Vadsø in Finnmark and Murmansk in Russia.

The first Tour de Ski (2006–07)
Jürg Capol stated that FIS originally wished to start the race in the Alps. However, as neither Austria or Switzerland were interested, the opening two stages were to be held in Nové Město na Moravě in the Czech Republic. A week before the Tour was due to start, FIS announced that snow conditions in Nové Město were not good enough, and cancelled the two races there. The first Tour de Ski therefore opened with a sprint race in Munich on 31 December 2006, and was won by Marit Bjørgen (NOR) and Christoph Eigenmann (SUI).

Skiers from France, Germany and Norway, among others, said that the Tour de Ski was among their targets for the 2006–07 season, with Norwegian skier Jens Arne Svartedal claiming that the winner would have "extreme respect" for winning such an extreme race. Tobias Angerer (GER) and Virpi Kuitunen (FIN) were the first overall winners of the Tour.

After the first Tour de Ski, reactions among athletes were largely positive. Norwegian athletes said "it was a good concept", German winner Tobias Angerer claimed that the Tour de Ski "has a great future", though many of the athletes expressed concern over the final climb up an alpine skiing hill both before and after the race. The director of FIS' cross-country committee, Vegard Ulvang, said the finish would be in the same place next year, but the way up could be changed. Ulvang also claimed that the Tour had been a success, and a "breakthrough for FIS" Ulvang did, however, admit that there would have to be some changes, as up to a third of participants in the Tour de Ski have struggled with illness or injury after the competition.

Newspaper comments were divided: in Expressen'''s opinion, the finish was the "most enjoyable competition seen in years," while Roland Wiedemann in Der Spiegel said this "should be the future of cross-country skiing". Critical commentaries appeared in Göteborgs-Posten, criticising the fact that sprinters didn't have a chance in the overall standings, and Wiesbaden Kurier, describing it as a reality show and a skiing circus.

Since 2007
The second Tour de Ski was held between 28 December 2007 and 6 January 2008, in the Czech Republic and Italy. Oberstdorf in Bavaria was originally scheduled to host two stages, but cancelled as the German Ski Association could only arrange a race on 2 January.

At a meeting in Venice, Italy, on 7 May 2009, Tour de Ski officials met with officials from the Giro d'Italia road cycle race to learn from the stage race to further improve Tour de Ski competition for the 2009–2010 event.

In the late 2000s and early 2010s, the women's Tour was dominated by Justyna Kowalczyk, who won the Tour de Ski four consecutive times and the sprint standings three consecutive times and a record 14 stages. Dario Cologna dominated the same period of time and won three Tours and two sprint competitions in four years from 2008–09 to 2011–12. In 2017–18, the season Cologna won his record fourth overall Tour, Alex Harvey of Canada and Jessie Diggins of USA became the first non-Europeans to achieve podium spot for men and women respectively in the overall standings. In 2021 Diggins became the first non-European to win Tour de Ski.

Race structure

Ranking

The overall results are based on the aggregate time for all events, as well as bonus seconds awarded on sprint and mass start stages.

The sprint races carry bonus seconds for the finish, which are subtracted from the overall time. The current bonus format in sprint competitions, as of 2022–23, hands out bonus seconds to the 30 skiers that qualify for the quarter-finals (60–54–48–46–44–42–32–30–28–26–24–22–10–10–10–8–8–8–8–8–6–6–6–6–6–4–4–4–4–4).

In mass start competitions, intermediate points carry bonus seconds; 15 to the winner, 10 to number two, and 5 to number three. The same number of seconds are usually awarded at the finish. In the later editions of the Tour, intermediate points has been handed out to the 10 first skiers (15–12–10–8–6–5–4–3–2–1) past the intermediate point.

The final stage of the race includes a steep climb up Alpe Cermis, with a height difference of 425 meters. By the 2018–19 Tour de Ski this last stage was held in a pursuit format, with competitors starting with the gaps they had in the overall classification, so the first skier to reach the top was the overall winner. Since 2019–20 Tour de Ski the Final Climb is held in a mass start format, with stage results added to overall classification.

Bibs

The overall leaders wear the leader bib on the following stage. The leader bib is from the 2019–20 edition colored yellow. From the start in 2006 to 2017–18 the leader bib was red and in the 2018–19 the leader wore a blue bib.

The leaders of the points competitions wear the points bib on the following stage. The bib worn by the leader of the points standings is from the 2019–20 edition colored red. In the previous editions of the Tour, the leader of the sprint standings wore a sprint bib; from the start in 2006 to 2017–18 this bib was black and in the 2018–19 the sprint bib was grey.

Prizes
Prizes and bonuses are awarded for daily placings and final placings at the end of the race. In 2023, the winners received CHF 80,000, while each of the stage winners won CHF 3,000. The winners of the points standings won CHF 6,000.

Winners by year

Men

Women

Stages
Mass start stages
In the mass start stages in the Tour de Ski, time bonuses are awarded to the top ten skiers of intermediate sprints. Since 2019–20, no bonus seconds are awarded based on the skiers finishing positions in the mass start stages. Until the 2018–19 edition, time bonuses of 15, 10 and 5 bonus seconds were usually awarded to the first three finishers. Mass-start stages are typically 5 km or 10 km for women and 10 km or 15 km for men, often raced by skiing several laps. Skiers who are overlapped by others will be excluded from the rest of the Tour. There are usually two or three mass start stages.

Interval start stages
In the interval start, or time trial stages in the Tour de Ski, skiers are sent out from the start in 30 second intervals. Interval start stages are typically 5 km or 10 km for women and 10 km or 15 km for men. Since 2019–20, no bonus seconds are awarded on the interval start stage. Time bonuses of 15, 10 and 5 bonus seconds were awarded to the three fastest skiers by the edition 2018–19. There are usually one or two interval start stages. Between 2007–08 and 2015, the first stage of the Tour was a short trial, a prologue''. The first prologue was in Oberhof, Germany in 2007 and the last in Oberstdorf, Germany, on 3 January 2015.

Sprint stages
The first ever Tour de Ski stage was a sprint stage in Munich, Germany, on 31 December 2006. Sprint stages consists of two rounds; a qualification round and a final round with a knock-out competition format. The 30 fastest skiers in the qualification round qualifies for the final round quarter-finals. In the quarter-, and semi-finals, the skiers compete in heats of six and the two best skiers in each heat are guaranteed progression. 12 skiers advance from the quarter-finals to the semi-finals of which six advance to the final. The winners are rewarded, as of 2022–23, 60 bonus seconds. The amount of bonus seconds are higher in sprint races then other types to encourage sprinter specialists to go for results in the overall standings. There are usually one or two sprint stages.

Final Climb
The Tour de Ski has every year concluded with the final stage in Val di Fiemme where the skiers race up the alpine skiing course on Alpe Cermis in Cavalese. The stage's length is 9.0 km in total, the climb itself 3.6 km with an average gradient of 11.6% and a maximum gradient of 28.0%.

By the edition 2018–19, this stage was raced as a free technique pursuit with starting intervals equal to the skiers accumulative times in the overall standings; which meant that the first skier to cross the finish line on Alpe Cermis was the winner of the Tour de Ski. If the time differences were big, the race jury could decide that the lowest ranked skiers started in a «wave start». Since 2019–20, the final stage is a mass start on same course. The stage results are added to overall standings.

Records
Nine men and six women have won both overall and sprint standings in the same Tour, the first being Virpi Kuitunen in the inaugural women's Tour. Johannes Høsflot Klæbo (twice), Sergey Ustiugov and Marit Bjørgen are the only skiers who have led the overall standings from the first stage and held the lead all the way to the top of Alpe Cermis. The most appearances have been by Jean-Marc Gaillard, who skied his 15th Tour in 2021, having finished 11 of them. In 2016, Petter Northug became the first skier to complete ten Tours. The smallest margins between the winner and the second placed skiers at the end of the Tour is 7.2 seconds between winner Virpi Kuitunen and Aino-Kaisa Saarinen in 2008–09. The largest margin, by comparison, remains that of the 2021 Tour: 3 min 23.9 s between Alexander Bolshunov and Maurice Manificat. The biggest winning margin in the women's Tour is 2 min 42.0 s between Ingvild Flugstad Østberg and Natalia Nepryaeva in 2018–19.

Skiers who won the Tour de Ski and an individual Olympic gold medal in the same year include: Justyna Kowalczyk (2010), Dario Cologna (2018) and Johannes Høsflot Klæbo (2022). Six skiers have won the Tour de Ski and an individual World Championship gold medal in the same year. These are: Virpi Kuitunen (2007), Marit Bjørgen (2015), Petter Northug (2015), Sergey Ustiugov (2017), Johannes Høsflot Klæbo (2019) and Alexander Bolshunov (2021).

Overall winners
Two skiers have won four times: Justyna Kowalczyk (POL) and Dario Cologna (SUI); Therese Johaug and Johannes Høsflot Klæbo have won three times and an additional three men and two women have won two times. Kowalczyk achieved the mark with a record four consecutive wins.

Stage wins

20 men and 19 women have won multiple stages in the Tour de Ski. Johannes Høsflot Klæbo has won the most stages with 17, followed by Justyna Kowalczyk and Therese Johaug with 14 victories and Petter Northug's with 13 stage wins. Klæbo won six consecutive stages in one edition (2022–23), which is a record. In previous editions Bjørgen (2015), Ustiugov (2016–17), and Bolshunov (2021) were able to win five consecutive stages.

 State at 8 January 2023

Most successful countries

Standings after the 2021–22 Tour de Ski and the disqualifications of Yevgeny Dementyev (Russia) in 2008–09, Alena Sidko (Russia) in 2009–10, Johannes Dürr (Austria) in 2013–14 and Martin Johnsrud Sundby (Norway) in 2015.

Venues
Ten venues have hosted stages of the Tour de Ski. Val di Fiemme is the only venue to host a stage in all 17 Tours.

Source:

1 Cancelled due to lack of snow
2 Relocated from Oberstdorf to Nové Město na Moravě due to scheduling problems

References

Sources

External links

 
Cross-country skiing competitions
FIS Cross-Country World Cup
Skiing in Europe
Recurring sporting events established in 2006
January sporting events
2006 establishments in Europe
December sporting events